Yasmin Sison-Ching is a female Filipino artist and painter.

Life

Biography

The artist was born in 1972 in Cavite. In 1988, she began her art education in the University of Philippines, Diliman. She held a degree in Humanities and Fine Arts and graduated as a cum laude. 
In 1992–1993, She studied for the Philippines Certificate for Professional Education in UP Diliman.
In 1994–1997, She took Philippines Bachelor of Fine Arts, Major in Painting.
In 2001, Yasmin also took the Philippines MA Art Education in UP Diliman.
In 2008, her artwork Bear, from the Into the Woods exhibition, was fetched the highest price at the Borobudur auction in Singapore. 
Yasmin is married to a fellow visual artist, Mariano Ching and she has a son named, Haraya Ching. Her works are inspired by mass media, other artists, and everyday life.

In her early years of art directions, Yasmin Sison-Ching began experimenting with abstract expressionism. The artist then moved toward representational imagery and has since made a mark with her unflinching portraits of children, capturing their emotional states as well as their physical and psychological transitions. In 1992, the artist assisted Emong Borlongan at the Cultural Center of the Philippines when he was teaching drawing at the summer workshop. Yasmin worked as a primary teacher at the Cavite Institute, Silang, Cavite in 1993–1994. She continued her professional experience as a lecturer in the Department of Arts and Letters in St. Benedict College, Alabang, Muntinlupa. She then taught grade school English and art full-time for a year and pursued Fine Arts after that. She taught Humanities and Fine Arts at St. Scholastica's College, Malate, Manila in 1998–2001. Then, Yasmin became an instructor at the Ayala Museum in 1999–2006. The artist was one of the members of the Surrounded by Water Gallery in Mandaluyong, and returned at the Cavite Institute to continue her grade school teaching career in 2002–2006. Her first solo exhibition was in 1995 at the West Gallery, Megamall.

Awards

Exhibitions

See also
 Mariano Ching
 Haraya Ching

Footnotes

Bibliography
 Sison-Ching, Y. (2009). Into the Woods. Manila: Finale Art File.
 Ong, J. P. (2008, May 26). Young Filipino artists outshine masters in International Auction. Philippine Daily Inquirer, p. 23.
 Sison-Ching, Y. (2015, April 25). Email interview.

External links
Yasmin Sison-Ching
Biography of Yasmin Sison-Ching
Top Ten Most Successful Visual Artists in Manila

Filipino artists
1972 births
Living people
Artists from Cavite
University of the Philippines Diliman alumni